Juan Queipo de Llano y Valdés (died 17 October 1643) was a Roman Catholic prelate who served as Bishop of Coria (1643) and Bishop of Guadix (1640–1643).

Biography
Juan Queipo de Llano y Valdés was born in Cangas de Tineo, Spain.
On 23 December 1639, he was selected by the King of Spain and confirmed by Pope Urban VIII on 13 August 1640 as Bishop of Guadix.
On 27 July 1642, he was consecrated bishop by Domingo Pimentel Zúñiga, Bishop of Córdoba, with Luis Camargo Pacheco, Titular Bishop of Centuria, and Blas Tineo Palacios, Titular Bishop of Thermopylae, serving as co-consecrators. 
On 13 July 1643, he was appointed during the papacy of Pope Urban VIII as Bishop of Coria.
He served as Bishop of Coria until his death on 17 October 1643. 
While bishop, he was the principal co-consecrator of Juan Valenzuela Velázquez, Bishop of Salamanca (1642).

References

External links and additional sources
 (for Chronology of Bishops)
 (for Chronology of Bishops)
 (for Chronology of Bishops) 
 (for Chronology of Bishops) 

17th-century Roman Catholic bishops in Spain
Bishops appointed by Pope Urban VIII
1643 deaths